Say When may refer to:

 Say When!!, a 1960s American gameshow
 Say When (film), an alternative title for the 2014 film Laggies
 Say When (musical), a 1934 musical by Ray Henderson
 "Say When" (song)", a 1998 song by Lonestar
 "Say When", a song by the Fray in their album The Fray, 2009
 "Say When", a song by Lene Lovich in their album Stateless, 1978